Dhinamthorum Deepavali is a 1984 Indian Tamil-language film, starring S. Ve. Shekher and Viji.

Cast

S. Ve. Shekher
Viji

References

1980 films
Films scored by Shankar–Ganesh
1980s Tamil-language films